Philip Griffiths (14 August 1892 – 29 October 1972) was a British sport shooter who competed in the 1924 Summer Olympics. In 1924, he finished in 40th place in the 25 metre rapid fire pistol competition.

References

External links
 

1892 births
1972 deaths
British male sport shooters
ISSF pistol shooters
Olympic shooters of Great Britain
Shooters at the 1924 Summer Olympics
Place of birth missing